Australozethus is an Australasian genus of potter wasps.

External links
Insects of Tasmania

References

Potter wasps